Anthony Joseph Emery (17 May 1918 – 5 April 1988) was an English prelate of the Roman Catholic Church. He served as the sixth Roman Catholic Bishop of Portsmouth from 1976 to 1988.

Life
Born in Burton upon Trent, Staffordshire in 1918, Emery enlisted in the military in 1940 and was released from service in 1945.

He was ordained a priest at Oscott for Archdiocese of Birmingham on 30 May 1953. He was appointed an Auxiliary Bishop of Birmingham and Titular Bishop of Tamallula on 6 December 1967. His consecration to the Episcopate took place at St Chad's Cathedral, Birmingham on 8 March 1968; the principal consecrator was Archbishop George Patrick Dwyer, with Bishops Rudderham and Cleary as co-consecrators. 

Eight years later, he was appointed the Bishop of the Diocese of Portsmouth on 13 September 1976.

Death
Bishop Emery died in office on 5 April 1988, aged 69.

References 

1918 births
1988 deaths
People from Burton upon Trent
Roman Catholic bishops of Portsmouth
20th-century Roman Catholic bishops in England
British military personnel of World War II